Streptomyces netropsis is a bacterium species from the genus of Streptomyces. Streptomyces netropsis produces the antibiotics netropsin and distamycin A and the antifungal polyene mycoheptin.

Further reading

See also 
 List of Streptomyces species

References

External links
Type strain of Streptomyces netropsis at BacDive -  the Bacterial Diversity Metadatabase	

netropsis
Bacteria described in 1991